This is the filmography for American actor Billy Dee Williams. He has appeared in 47 films, and numerous television roles. He played Lando Calrissian in three Star Wars films, and Harvey Dent in Tim Burton's Batman. He is also well-known for roles in The Last Angry Man, Carter's Army, The Out-of-Towners, The Final Comedown, Lady Sings the Blues, Hit!, Mahogany, Scott Joplin, Nighthawks, Fear City, Terror in the Aisles, Alien Intruder, The Visit, The Ladies Man, Fanboys and The Lego Movie.

He was nominated for an Emmy Award and a Golden Globe for the TV movie Brian's Song.

Film

Television

Short subjects

Music videos
 Let's Misbehave LP (1961)

Video games

References

American filmographies
Male actor filmographies